KlickEx is a Polynesian Central Bank Money payments system for domestic, high value, low value, securities, cheque, and electronic foreign exchange transactions using an interbank smart market retail system.  It provides exchange clearing service platforms to central bank, commercial bank, nonbank, and non-financial clients in the Pacific Islands, also providing a guaranteed fund, net settlement, retail servicing to mobile money operations across the region, avoiding the usual foreign transfer delays, fees and spreads by matching up individuals (and institutions) or central-bank-settling payments to and from the islands.

Payments can be made between the Pacific Islands and Australia, New Zealand, and Europe. The system also allows users to transfer directly to mobile wallets, and Bank accounts.

KlickEx is both a systems provider, and a licensed and prudentially supervised payment systems, for acceleraring traditional international bank transfers and payments for older remittance networks where the minimum transfer fees would often make it uneconomical to send low value payments that are typical for migrant workers and relatives of the island communities.

History
The company name is derived from the title: The Klick Exchange Trading Company.  The company was resident of the ICE-house incubator innovation centre in Auckland.

The KlickEx system is based on trading technology that has been operational since 2002.

Through a regional partnership with the United Nations Development Program, and the Australian and New Zealand Governments in 2011; KlickEx continued to build services and by providing the platform for Mobile Carriers (MNO) to integrate mobile wallet platforms into the established banking system; thereby accelerating the penetration of financial services to the unbanked in the Pacific, particularly focusing on Rural communities, and financial inclusion for women in developing economies.

In 2012, the company was a finalist for several New Zealand Hi-Tech Awards, in several categories including Ministry of Science and Innovation Start-up of the Year, Best New Software, Best New Service (2012).

Services
The company has three core divisions: A retail operation, providing payment services in the South Pacific, an Institutional operation, connecting smaller banks to regional and world-wide clearing networks, and NGO/Development operations, providing regulators and government agencies with statistical and compliance solutions.

The company provides three core products to participants:
 An open access Private electronic market for multi-currency settlements.  The micro-currency system provides members the facility to move both ultra-low-value and high-value quantities of foreign exchange through the foreign exchange markets, without traditional FX margins.
 multi-regional clearing, verification, and order forwarding, this allows the proceeds of multi-currency settlements to be forwarded on electronically at bank-bank exchange rates, providing end users efficient access to overhead-free FX rates.
 cashflow tracking services and wealth management systems enable enhanced transparency and consumer security across a multi-currency platform.

KlickEx operates a straight-through processing settlement system that enables individuals and partnership banks to gain access to cross-border foreign currency clearing facilities and rapid settlement between accounts, delivering cleared funds across currencies in seconds. The system micro-manages standing orders for foreign exchange as little as NZ$1.00.  With retail clients in New Zealand, Australia, Tonga and Samoa having immediate access following a short approval and Anti-money laundering process.

Awards & Industry Recognition
University of Auckland Business School Entrepreneurs' Challenge 2011 (shared with three other companies)  
 SWIFT Innotribe, Top Start-up of 2013.
 KlickEx staff have also received various notations; including (1) NZ Hi-Tech Young Achiever of 2012; (2) Geeks on a Plane 2013, venture pitch competition; (3) NZ Hi-Tech Young Achiever of 2013; (4) Top Executives Shaping the Future of Banking, 2013 (Robert Bell). (5) Top Executives Shaping the Future of Banking 2014  (5) Most Inspiring New Zealanders 2014

References

Software companies of New Zealand
Interbank networks
Electronic funds transfer
Foreign exchange companies
Management systems